Dolgoma lucida is a moth of the family Erebidae. It is found in south-western China.

References

Moths described in 2000
Dolgoma